The 2015–16 Northeastern Huskies women's basketball team represents the Northeastern University during the 2015–16 NCAA Division I women's basketball season. The Huskies, led by second year head coach Kelly Cole, play their home games at the Cabot Center with one game at Matthews Arena and were members of the Colonial Athletic Association. They finished the season 15–16, 9–9 CAA play to finish in sixth place. They advanced to the semifinals of the CAA women's tournament where they lost to Towson.

Roster

Schedule

|-
! colspan="9" style="background:#c00; color:#000;"| Non-conference regular season

|-
! colspan="9" style="background:#c00; color:#000;"| CAA regular season

|-
! colspan="9" style="background:#c00; color:#000;"| CAA Women's Tournament

See also
2015–16 Northeastern Huskies men's basketball team

References

Northeastern Huskies women's basketball seasons
Northeastern